"Out of My Head" is a song by English singer and songwriter Charli XCX, featuring Swedish singer Tove Lo and Finnish singer Alma, released as the lead single from her fourth mixtape Pop 2 on 8 December 2017 by Asylum Records and Atlantic Records UK.

Promotion
Charli XCX announced her new mixtape, Pop 2, and subsequently released 'Out of My Head' as the lead single from the mixtape. The song was premiered on BBC Radio 1 on December 6, 2017.

Charts

References

2017 songs
2017 singles
Charli XCX songs
Tove Lo songs
Alma (Finnish singer) songs
Songs written by Charli XCX
Songs written by A. G. Cook
Songs written by Sophie (musician)
Songs written by Tove Lo
Asylum Records singles
Atlantic Records singles
Songs written by Alma (Finnish singer)
Song recordings produced by Sophie (musician)